Carlos Bergara (8 May 1895 – 29 March 1971) was an Argentine weightlifter. He competed in the men's light-heavyweight event at the 1924 Summer Olympics.

References

External links
 

1895 births
1971 deaths
Argentine male weightlifters
Olympic weightlifters of Argentina
Weightlifters at the 1924 Summer Olympics
Sportspeople from Buenos Aires
20th-century Argentine people